Castaños  is one of the 38 municipalities of Coahuila, in north-eastern Mexico. The municipal seat lies at Castaños. The municipality covers an area of 7860 km².

As of 2005, the municipality had a total population of 23,871.

References

See also
 Wells of Baján

Municipalities of Coahuila